Mirlind Kryeziu (born 26 January 1997) is a professional footballer who plays as a centre-back for Zürich. Born in Switzerland, he represents the Kosovo national team.

Club career

Zürich

Early career and Zürich U21
Kryeziu at the age of 7, he started playing football in Zürich. On 20 September 2014, he made his debut with Zürich U21 in a 2–2 away defeat against Breitenrain Bern after coming on as a substitute at 88th minute in place of Fabijan Markaj.

Loan at Biel-Bienne
On 6 July 2015, Kryeziu joined Swiss Challenge League side Biel-Bienne, on a season-long loan. On 5 December 2015, he made his debut in a 1–0 away defeat against Winterthur after being named in the starting line-up.

Promotion to the first team
On 13 February 2017, Kryeziu made his debut in a 1–1 home draw against Neuchâtel Xamax after being named in the starting line-up, Two months after debut, he signed his first professional contract with Swiss Challenge League side Zürich after agreeing to a four-year deal.

Loan at Kriens
On 16 February 2021, Kryeziu joined Swiss Challenge League side Kriens, on a season-long loan.

International career
At the start of April 2013, Kryeziu received a call-up from Albania U15 for a selection camp in Switzerland. From 16 April 2013 to 28 March 2017, he has been part of Switzerland at youth international level, respectively has been part of the U16, U17, U18, U19 and U20 teams and he with these teams played 29 matches and scored one goal. On 9 November 2018, Kryeziu received a call-up from Kosovo for the 2018–19 UEFA Nations League matches against Malta and Azerbaijan, he was an unused substitute in these matches. On 2 September 2021, Kryeziu made his debut with Kosovo in a 2022 FIFA World Cup qualification match against Georgia after coming on as a substitute at last minutes in place of Valon Berisha.

Personal life
Kryeziu was born in Zürich, Switzerland from Kosovo Albanian parents from Mleqani, a village near Mališevo. He holds Kosovan and Swiss passports.

Career statistics

Club

References

External links

Mirlind Kryeziu at Swiss Football League
Mirlind Kryeziu at FC Zürich
Mirlind Kryeziu at Switzerland U16
Mirlind Kryeziu at Switzerland U17
Mirlind Kryeziu at Switzerland U18
Mirlind Kryeziu at Switzerland U19
Mirlind Kryeziu at Switzerland U20

1997 births
Living people
Footballers from Zürich
Kosovan footballers
Swiss men's footballers
Kosovo international footballers
Association football central defenders
Switzerland youth international footballers
Swiss Promotion League players
Swiss Challenge League players
Swiss Super League players
FC Zürich players
FC Biel-Bienne players
SC Kriens players
Kosovan expatriate footballers
Kosovan expatriate sportspeople in Switzerland